Kim Hee-Min (born 22 October 1984), better known by his pen name Kian84 (기안84), is a South Korean manhwaga. He is best known for writing the webtoon Fashion King  and as a member of Korean variety show I Live Alone.

Personal life 
On March 8, 2022, it was confirmed that Kian will hold His first solo exhibition, titled 1st Solo Exhibition' (subtitle: Full所有), will run from March 25, 2022 to April 5, 2022.

Philanthropy 
On May 24, 2022, he donated 87 million won to the Children's Orphanage. It also revealed the details of the donations of 15 youths studying the arts.

Filmography

Television Series

Film

Variety Shows

Web shows

Music video

Awards and nominations

References

External links

 Official blog

South Korean manhwa artists
South Korean webtoon creators
Mystic Entertainment artists
People from Icheon
South Korean television personalities
21st-century pseudonymous writers
University of Suwon alumni
1984 births
Living people